The Orbital Maneuvering System (OMS) is a system of hypergolic liquid-propellant rocket engines used on the Space Shuttle and the Orion MPCV. Designed and manufactured in the United States by Aerojet, the system allowed the orbiter to perform various orbital maneuvers according to requirements of each mission profile: orbital injection after main engine cutoff, orbital corrections during flight, and the final deorbit burn for reentry. From STS-90 onwards the OMS were typically ignited part-way into the Shuttle's ascent for a few minutes to aid acceleration to orbital insertion. Notable exceptions were particularly high-altitude missions such as those supporting the Hubble Space Telescope (STS-31) or those with unusually heavy payloads such as Chandra (STS-93). An OMS dump burn also occurred on STS-51-F, as part of the Abort to Orbit procedure.

The OMS consists of two pods mounted on the orbiter's aft fuselage, on either side of the vertical stabilizer. Each pod contains a single AJ10-190 engine, based on the Apollo Service Module's Service Propulsion System engine, which produces  of thrust with a specific impulse (Isp) of 316 seconds. The oxidizer-to-fuel ratio is 1.65-to-1, The expansion ratio of the nozzle exit to the throat is 55-to-1, and the chamber pressure of the engine is 8.6 bar. The dry weight of each engine is 118kg (260lb). Each engine could be reused for 100 missions and was capable of a total of 1,000 starts and 15 hours of burn time.

These pods also contained the Orbiter's aft set of reaction control system (RCS) engines, and so were referred to as OMS/RCS pods. The OM engine and RCS both burned monomethylhydrazine (MMH) as fuel, which was oxidized with dinitrogen tetroxide, with the propellants being stored in tanks within the OMS/RCS pod, alongside other fuel and engine management systems.

Proposed OMS Payload Bay Kit 
It was never built, but to augment the OMS an OMS Payload Bay Kit was proposed. It would have used one, two or three sets of OMS tanks, installed in the payload bay, to provide an extra 150 m/s, 300 m/s or 450 m/s( (500 ft, 1000 ft/s or 1500 ft/s) of delta-V to the orbiter. The orbiter control panels had related switches and gauges but they were nonfunctional.

Orion ESM Main Engine

Following the retirement of the Shuttle, these engines were repurposed for use on the Orion spacecraft's service module. This variant uses Monomethylhydrazine as fuel, with nitrogen tetroxide (N2O4) as oxidizer. It is planned to be used for the first six flights of the Artemis program, afterwards it would be replaced by a new "Orion Main Engine" starting Artemis 7.

References

Space Shuttle program